Luca Pasquale Medici (born 3 June 1977), known as Checco Zalone (modeled on the Italianized Barese insult), is an Italian actor, musician, singer-songwriter, imitator, comedian and screenwriter. He co-wrote and starred in the five highest-grossing Italian films in Italy headed by Quo Vado?.

Biography and career
Luca Medici was born in Capurso, in the first hinge of the metropolitan area of Bari, close to the suburbs south of the city. The pseudonym Checco Zalone, recalls the local expression , meaning "what a boor!". During his teens he was very fond of video games and spent most of his afternoons indoors. He graduated from the scientific high school Sante Simone in Conversano; he later enrolled at the University of Bari, where he graduated in law. In the meantime he participates in the competitions as deputy police inspector and INAIL in Rimini, but is rejected.

After being a regular in many editions of the  variety show , he became famous in 2006 thanks to the song "" (meaning "we are a very strong team" in broken Italian), celebrating the Italian team just before the 2006 FIFA World Cup.

It opened with a record Italian opening weekend of $9.4 million and became the highest-grossing Italian film of all-time in Italy, grossing €43.4 million, surpassing Roberto Benigni's Life Is Beautiful. Life Is Beautiful retained the worldwide record for an Italian film with $70 million worldwide.

In January 2016, his and Nunziate's next film Quo Vado? set another opening weekend record grossing over €22m (£16.5m) over the three-day holiday weekend and went on to become the highest-grossing Italian film of all-time with €65.3 million, second only to Avatar in Italy with €65.7 million. In the same year, Zalone was the Italian testimonial of the funding raising campaign for the research on Spinal muscular atrophy. His and Nunziate's films are currently the second, third, fifth and sixth highest-grossing films in Italy.

On 30 April 2021, Checco Zalone released the video of his song "La vacinada" (meaning "the vaccinated woman" in pseudo-Spanish), starring English actress Helen Mirren. In the song, Zalone jokes about the fact that, in times of Covid-19 pandemic, it is safer to have an affair with someone who has already been vaccinated against the virus, and therefore the best option is a higher-aged partner, as the elderly are the ones who were vaccinated first.

In 2022 he has been guest at Sanremo Music Festival with a medley.

Filmography
  (2009)
  (2011)
  (2013)
 Quo Vado? (2016)
 Tolo Tolo (2020)

References

External links

1977 births
Living people
People from Bari
Italian singer-songwriters
Italian comedians
21st-century Italian musicians
Italian male film actors
Italian comedy musicians
Italian screenwriters
Italian male screenwriters
21st-century Italian singers